Cory Orville Reid (born March 30, 1994), better known by his stage name Nebu Kiniza, is an American hip hop recording artist from Queens, New York. He is best known for his single "Gassed Up", which was released in October 25, 2015 and certified platinum in the United States in May 2018. He is signed to OSHS (On Some Hippy S**t) and RCA Records.

Early life
Nebu Kiniza's family moved from Queens to Pawling, NY and then to Conyers, a suburb of Atlanta, GA, when he was 10. He learned the ropes of the music business from his mother, a singer. Attending Rockdale County High School, he began freestyling at 15 and discovered his talent.

Career
He released his first track, "IDGAF," in 2011, and his first mixtape, 2 Peace Signs, in 2012.

In 2013, he released his second mixtape, The Honor Roller, with music videos for the tracks "The Grind" and "Steez." The "Steez" video, shot in Atlanta's Little Five Points neighborhood, received over 300,000 views on YouTube.

His third mixtape, Hypnosis, which featured production from American record producer Sonny Digital, was released in 2014. The track "Myself" became his first major hit and was remixed by ILoveMakonnen & Key!.

Along the way Nebu created his own label, On Some Hippy Sh*t, for himself and his crew of producers.

His biggest hit to date, "Gassed Up," produced by MexikoDro – a track that he has said took all of 15 minutes to create – received over 52 million listens on SoundCloud, 34 million views on YouTube and 80 million plays on Spotify. Kiniza reached #10 on the Next Big Sound chart (24 December 2016), and "Gassed Up" hit #15 on the Spotify Velocity chart  and #18 on BigChampagne's Emerging Artist chart on 2 March 2017.

With respect to his moniker, he explained that his aunt jokingly suggested naming him after King Nebuchadnezzar when he was born. He thus felt identified with the name for his whole life, and adapted it for real when it was time to adopt a stage name. "Nebu stands for the golden one. Kiniza stands for being originally creative and artistic. So I put two-and-two together."

Stage name
His stage name references the biblical King Nebuchadnezzar II.

Discography

Mixtapes

Singles

As lead artist

As featured artist

References

Living people
1994 births
African-American male rappers
Rappers from Atlanta
Rappers from New York City
People from Queens, New York
21st-century American rappers
21st-century American male musicians
21st-century African-American musicians